Trachelipus planarius is a species of woodlouse in the genus Trachelipus belonging to the family Trachelipodidae that can be found in Sicily.

References

Trachelipodidae
Endemic arthropods of Sicily
Woodlice of Europe
Crustaceans described in 1885